The Bastianelli P.R.B was a 1920s Italian flying-boat, the first product of Societá Industriale l'Aviazone.

Design and development
The Bastianelli P.R.B (named after the three Italians that formed the company Giovanni Pegga, Giuseppe Rossi and Filippo Bastianelli) was a large span two-bay biplane flying boat. It was powered by four  Fiat A.12bis inline piston engines mounted in tandem pairs on the lower wing. Built in Rome it was transported to Lido di Ostia for completion and testing and it first flew on 11 May 1921 piloted by Rossi. Although it flew well, only one was built and it did not enter production.

Specifications

See also

References

Notes

Bibliography

Bastianelli PRB
Flying boats
1920s Italian civil utility aircraft
Biplanes
Four-engined push-pull aircraft
Aircraft first flown in 1921